The White Room was an Australian television trivia game show broadcast on the Seven Network. The show was hosted by Tony Moclair and Julian Schiller. It debuted on 11 February 2010, and last aired on 18 February 2010, as the show was cancelled after just 2 episodes.

References

External links

2010 Australian television series debuts
2010 Australian television series endings
Seven Network original programming
2010s Australian game shows